James Laverne Dutcher (May 10, 1918 – December 14, 1992) was an American football coach.  He served as the 23rd head football coach at Doane College in Crete, Nebraska and he held that position for ten seasons, from 1942 until 1951.  His coaching record at Doane was 52–28–5.  Dutcher led his team to a victory in the 1950 Bean Bowl by a score of 14 to 6 on November 23, 1950.

Dutcher later served as the head coach for Cornell College in Mount Vernon, Iowa from 1953 to 1958, where he compiled a record of 17–27–4.

Head coaching record

Football

References

External links
 

1918 births
1992 deaths
Basketball coaches from Nebraska
Cornell Rams football coaches
Doane Tigers football coaches
Doane Tigers men's basketball coaches
People from Hebron, Nebraska